Ligonier Historic District may refer to:

Ligonier Historic District (Ligonier, Indiana), listed on the National Register of Historic Places in Noble County, Indiana
Ligonier Historic District (Ligonier, Pennsylvania), listed on the National Register of Historic Places in Westmoreland County, Pennsylvania